The Turkey International in badminton is an international open held in Turkey since 2007.
The tournament belongs to the EBU Circuit. Turkish National Badminton Championships are played since the year 1993.

Previous winners

References

External links
Tournament Website

Badminton tournaments in Turkey
Badminton in Turkey
Sports competitions in Turkey
Recurring sporting events established in 2007
2007 establishments in Turkey